This is a list of all cricketers who have captained the United States in an official international match. These include One Day Internationals and ICC Trophy games.

One Day International

The United States played their first ODI on September 10, 2004 as part of the ICC Intercontinental Cup.

ICC 6 Nations Challenge

The United States participated in the final edition of this tournament between the top Associate nations from February 29-March 6, 2004.

ICC Trophy

The United States debuted in the ICC Trophy in the 1979 tournament.

ICC World Twenty20 Qualifier

The United States first entered the ICC World Twenty20 Qualifier in 2010. This table also includes records from the T20 Americas region qualifying tournaments.

See also 
 List of United States of America ODI cricketers
 United States national cricket team

References

External links 
Cricinfo
American ICC Trophy captains at Cricket Archive 

Cricket captains
United States in international cricket
American
Captains